The 2010 Surakarta mayoral election took place on 27 June 2010. The election resulted in a landslide victory for the incumbent mayor Joko Widodo, who won over 90 percent of the votes.

Candidates
The incumbent mayor, Joko Widodo, ran for a second term, with his deputy F.X. Hadi Rudyatmo remaining as his running mate. Aside from their party PDI-P, they were also endorsed by the National Mandate Party and the Prosperous Justice Party. Opposing the pair was the Edy Wirabhumi and Supradi Kertamenawi ticket, who were endorsed by the Democratic Party and Golkar.

Results

The turnout for the election was the highest among other mayoral elections held in Central Java in that year. The votes were held in 932 polling stations, with Widodo only losing in a single station.

References

Mayoral elections in Indonesia
2010 elections in Asia
Surakarta
Elections in Central Java